Disney's Lilo & Stitch is an American science fiction media franchise that began in 2002 with the animated film of the same name written and directed by Chris Sanders and Dean DeBlois. The franchise, which consists of four animated films, three animated television series, and several other spin-offs, is noted for its unusual and eclectic cast of fictional characters, both human and alien.

Characters introduced in Lilo & Stitch

Stitch (X-626)

Stitch (Experiment 626) is one of the two title characters of the Lilo & Stitch franchise. Originally an illegal genetic experiment created by mad alien scientist Dr. Jumba Jookiba to cause chaos across the galaxy, he is marked by his short temper and mischievous behavior (traits that endear him to his friend Lilo, who adopted him as her "dog"). He is voiced by his creator and the film's co-writer and co-director, Chris Sanders, in all official media, except the Stitch! anime and Stitch & Ai, where he is voiced in English by Ben Diskin.

Lilo Pelekai

Lilo Pelekai (literally, "lost" in Hawaiian) is one of the two title characters of the franchise. She is a young Native Hawaiian girl who lives on the island of Kauai with her older sister Nani and her extended family of alien visitors marooned on Earth. She is voiced by Daveigh Chase in all the films and Lilo & Stitch: The Series, except Lilo & Stitch 2: Stitch Has a Glitch where she was voiced by Dakota Fanning.

Lilo is a young girl with long, straight black hair and brown eyes. She is most often seen wearing a muumuu and sandals, but also wears other warm-weather clothing as well as traditional hula costumes. In Lilo & Stitch 2: Stitch Has a Glitch; her reflection in a mirror is compared to a picture of her young mother, suggesting that they look similar. In the episode "Skip" where an experiment (Experiment 089) is used to skip time ten then another ten years, it is mentioned that older Lilo looks a lot like her sister Nani.

Her spirited and highly eccentric personality, especially in light of her parents' death, has alienated her from her fellow children, yet Lilo makes the perfect best friend for Stitch, an alien experiment whom she adopts as her dog. Lilo attends hula school and her hobbies include the photography of tourists (especially obese people), talking about creatures from horror/sci-fi movies, and capturing and rehabilitating Jumba's evil genetic experiments. In "Swapper", she meets Victoria, who turns out to have similar personalities to her and she becomes Lilo's only human friend, she also attends Lilo's hula school. In "Spooky", it is revealed that Lilo is afraid of broccoli, clowns, and the scary/haunted house on the hill nearby where she lives. It is also revealed in this episode that Lilo, like her father, plays guitar. While frequently shown to be a strong swimmer like many Hawaiians, Lilo is also a strong free diver, shown when she swam from the stalled x-buggy in sub-mode and carrying Rufus, to Drakken's lair on the bottom of the ocean to rescue Kim Possible and Stitch.

Lilo is also known for being a passionate fan of Elvis Presley; this trait of hers is based on Lilo & Stitch director/writer Chris Sanders being a fan of Presley himself.

Lilo's parents died in a car accident some time before Lilo & Stitch (it is suggested that rain made road conditions treacherous), and they have not appeared in the series apart from three photographs: one of Lilo, Nani, and their parents having a picnic on the beach, a photograph of Lilo's mother winning the Hula contest at her school's May Day celebration, and a photo of Nani with her parents when she graduated to intermediate Hula.

Lilo's mother is depicted as kind and loving (and perhaps eccentric like her younger daughter), as well as an excellent hula dancer. She would placate her children by holding a family night, singing lullabies, and making up funny constellations. Lilo's father played the ukulele and was the one who coined the phrase Ohana means family, and family means nobody gets left behind or forgotten. The phrase becomes a sort of family motto for his daughters and their intergalactic adopted clan. Lilo loves and misses her parents very much; she keeps a picture of them under her pillow and initially would not allow Stitch to touch it (rejecting him when his fight with Jumba caused her house and the picture to become damaged). In the episode "Remmy", which takes place on the anniversary of the accident, Lilo is depressed and takes a nap to help deal with her sadness. The picture is used to turn Lilo's nightmares into a dream of the day the photograph was taken, which manages to make her happy again (for some strange reason, however, the picture is completely undamaged in this episode).

The development of Lilo's ohana (extended family) begins with the adoption of Stitch in Lilo & Stitch. Though Lilo technically owns Stitch by Hawaiian state law, the relationship between the two is more like siblings and best friends. By the end of the series, Lilo's extended ohana includes Nani, "Uncle" Jumba and "Aunt" Pleakley, David, Cobra Bubbles, the Grand Councilwoman, Victoria, all 627 (627 and 628 were shown dehydrated in the episode of 627, although it could be argued that they still count) of Stitch's "cousins", Gantu and finally Mertle.

Lilo does not return as a main character in the anime series Stitch!. The original Japanese version contradicts and leaves many plot holes to what had occurred in the original films; one that is most mentioned is the separation of Lilo and Stitch. For unknown reasons, Madhouse decided to remove Lilo from the show and leave her absence open to the viewer's imagination, to replace her with their own character named Yuna. Lilo does not appear until episode 23 of the Shin-Ei Animation-produced ~Best Friends Forever~ (Season 3), where she, now a fully grown woman, visits Okinawa's Newtown with her daughter named Ani (who looks incredibly like her when she was a child and whom Stitch thought was Lilo in the beginning). As both friends reunite we learn that Lilo still truly loves and cares about Stitch and there was never any boyfriend. Lilo had gone to college and they planned to meet on the beach when she returned, but when that day came, Nani was heavily pregnant and caused Lilo to be late. Stitch, for unknown reasons, was never aware of Nani's condition (although the English dub states that Stitch had been away on missions with the Galactic Armada throughout Lilo's time in college, which might provide an explanation for him being unaware of Nani's condition), and since Lilo didn't arrive at the time they planned, he thought she had forgotten about him. He leaves his tiki necklace (the one Lilo gave to him in Leroy & Stitch) on the beach before flying away in his ship. By the time Lilo arrives, he had already left. Lilo discovers this when she finds his necklace on the beach and cries. In the end, before Lilo and her daughter board the plane, Stitch arrives in time to see her again. They both have a happy reunion, she hugs him, promises to visit him again, and asks Stitch to take good care of his new family. She then gives Stitch his tiki necklace back before leaving.

Lilo is also removed as a main character in the Chinese animated series Stitch & Ai; she only appears in flashback scenes based on scenes from the Western continuity. The cold open of the sixth episode reveals that Stitch has almost completely forgotten about her (only having vague memories of his life with her) as when he fell back to Earth and re-entered its atmosphere in the first episode, "special qi energy" surrounded him to protect him from the heat of re-entry, but the energy also affected his memories, including those of his past with Lilo. While it is not known how old she is by the events of this series, the flashback scenes in the first episode do reveal that Stitch was forcibly separated from her when he was kidnapped by space criminals.

Scrump

Scrump is Lilo's personal rag doll that she made herself. "She" (as Lilo treats the doll) is a green doll with a large head (which Lilo passes off by pretending that an insect laid eggs in it), mismatching button eyes and navel, an unevenly stitched mouth, and straw "hair" tied together with a pink bow. The doll is seen throughout the franchise, with Lilo often seen holding it for comfort. Stitch interacts with it on occasion, usually passively, although various merchandise and promotional imagery portray him as loving and/or interacting with the doll in such marketing material. Being an inanimate object, "she" does not speak, although Nancy Cartwright voiced the doll in an episode of Lilo & Stitch: The Series when Experiment 375, also known as Phantasmo, possessed the doll.

In the first film, Lilo tries to use Scrump to join Mertle Edmonds and her posse in playing dolls with them, but the girls, who otherwise have normal-looking Barbie-like dolls, get scared by the rag doll's appearance and quietly run away while Lilo wasn't paying attention. Lilo throws the rag doll to the ground in anger and walks off on her way home for a few seconds, but runs back to retrieve it, hugging "her" as she resumes her walk home. Notably, Scrump briefly turns "her" head to the camera seemingly on "her" own accord as Lilo walks out of frame; director Chris Sanders confirmed in a TikTok video that the brief moment was deliberately added by the animation staff as an Easter egg. Later in the film, Stitch uses the doll to make a bomb in his fight against Jumba.

Scrump becomes a major focus in the Lilo & Stitch: The Series episode "Phantasmo", where Experiment 375, a green ghostly experiment who can possess inanimate objects, takes control of the doll and uses it to cause mischief in the Pelekai household, framing Stitch for the problems the green experiment causes. Throughout the episode, Stitch tries to fight the doll and tell Lilo that the problems he is blamed for are the doll's fault, but although she does believe Stitch to be innocent, she does not believe it was Scrump's fault until she sees it destroy Pleakley's plant. The experiment inside the doll then reveals himself and ties her, Jumba, and Pleakley together, then repossesses Scrump to fire a plasma blaster at them until Stitch comes in to save his family, causing the experiment to dispossess the doll and run off.

In the Stitch! anime series, it is revealed that the now-adult Lilo has given Scrump to her daughter Ani as a hand-me-down.

Nani Pelekai

Nani Pelekai is Lilo Pelekai's older sister and legal guardian. She carries the burden of supporting herself and her younger sister both financially and parentally. Naturally, she is usually very busy and under a great deal of stress. Her age is not made clear, but the fact that she was made her sister's guardian suggests that she is at least eighteen years old by the time of the first movie. She loves Lilo devotedly but does not always understand her. Nani often serves as a gentle voice of reason and advice in the films and show—and occasionally, not so gentle. It was Nani, in the original film, who allowed Lilo to adopt Stitch from the pound, where he had been mistaken for a dog. She is voiced by Tia Carrere in the films and Lilo & Stitch: The Series.

As a result of her stress, Nani is easily aggravated by Lilo and Stitch's antics, which often, unfortunately, interfere with her ability to find and hold a stable job. She frequently has to cope with and clean up after the various crises which involve Lilo, Stitch, Jumba, and Pleakley (who often tries to help around the house, with mixed results). Her busy life sometimes makes it difficult for her to maintain a normal relationship with David Kawena, a local surfer, who is Nani's friend in the original film and later love interest. She is renowned among her household for her bad cooking. Her worst fear is noted to be losing Lilo to social workers like Cobra Bubbles, whom she at first disliked but, after the events of the first film, comes to trust and respect.

Jumba Jookiba

Dr. Jumba Jookiba (misspelled as Jumba Jukiba in some media) is the creator of Stitch and his "cousins." He is an overweight, mostly purple-skinned alien from the planet Kweltikwan/Quelte Quan speaking in a vaguely Russian accent, with dark pink skin on his front torso and armpits, a huge and mostly bald ovalish head with three black hairs, a wide mouth, a little nose and four yellow eyes. He has been called an "idiot scientist", but he prefers to be known as an evil genius and is in fact surprisingly sociable and friendly outside of his work. He was voiced by veteran character actor David Ogden Stiers in the films, Lilo & Stitch: The Series, Disney's Stitch: Experiment 626, and Kingdom Hearts Birth by Sleep, while The Series executive producer and screenwriter Jess Winfield voices him in the Stitch! anime and Stitch & Ai.

Jumba's greatest asset is his abnormally high IQ, hindered only by a few small and occasional lapses in memory. His penchant for creating numerous destructive, complex experiments and machinery is nearly unrivaled, and his creation 626 is proof of his genius, being nearly unbeatable, as well as one of the most formidable fighters in the galaxy. He has also completely memorized the number and technical info on every one of Stitch's "cousins" he created. Jumba also has above average strength and durability, as seen in his confrontation with Stitch towards the end of Lilo & Stitch, where he is able to fight Stitch one-on-one reasonably well (a feat even the 20-foot-tall Captain Gantu is unable to do). Jumba's above average lifting capacity is demonstrated when he uses a comb device as a penetrating projectile. His astounding durability is demonstrated when he is repeatedly hit with various heavy objects by Stitch (including a Volkswagen Beetle), and at one point hurled through a wall, and only comes up a little shaken. Also he, along with Stitch, survives being at the center of a plasma explosion powerful enough to destroy Lilo's house.

Jumba Jookiba graduated from Evil Genius University with Dr. Jacques von Hämsterviel, his lab partner. Shortly afterward, it is said the two opened up a joke shop together. When Jumba became the Lead Scientist of Galaxy Defense Industries, the two began work on Jumba's experiments, 001 becoming known as Shrink. The team-up went like this: Jumba created the experiments and Hämsterviel funded them with his shady business deals. However, for those 25 years of partnership, Hämsterviel did nothing but, as put by Jumba, "cheat Jumba, embarrass Jumba, steal from Jumba, and finally, fink on Jumba to Galactic Federation," for his illegal experimentation.

Thus, in the first movie, he stood erect before the Galactic Federation, having been accused of creating illegal genetic experiments. He was incarcerated because of his forbidden genetic experiments, but later released and sent off to Earth with Pleakley in order to recapture one of his creations, Experiment 626. He was later quietly left on Earth (likely to avoid becoming a nuisance elsewhere in the galaxy) and has become a part of Lilo's extended family.

Jumba's sense of technology is also a hobby; he has made modifications to the house, such as a vacuum-tube elevator in the hallway leading to Lilo and Stitch's room, added when the house was rebuilt at the end of Lilo & Stitch. In one episode, he completely updated the house, only to have his technology turn against him, thanks to Experiment 223 (Glitch), who was captured in Lilo's handheld game. He has also made many modifications to Lilo and Stitch's dune buggy to perfect it for catching his other experiments which landed on Earth not long after Jumba's arrival. He also had a mean ex-wife who he is terrified of. In one episode, he says that a particular fish, which resembles a lamprey eel, reminds him of her "before face-lift."

Three years after Jumba's experiments were scattered across Kauai, Hawaii, Lilo and Stitch had rounded up and reformed 624 experiments. Jumba was given the opportunity to return to his old laboratory by the Grand Councilwoman. At first, he did not want to hurt Lilo's feelings by leaving, but she agreed to let him go, giving him an Elvis record to remember her by. However, Hämsterviel escaped prison with the help of the former Captain Gantu, who had been retired from his position forcibly by the Grand Councilwoman three years prior to these events, and held Jumba hostage in his own lab, forcing him to create a new experiment, which ends up named Leroy. However, Jumba used the record Lilo gave him to program a shut-off switch for Leroy: if he hears the song "Aloha ʻOe", he will glitch and switch off (but will not die like Stitch would have as shown at the end of Stitch Has a Glitch). When asked what he would like as a reward, he decides to give up his laboratory and return to Earth to become part of Lilo's family once again.

Jumba appears in Kingdom Hearts Birth by Sleep along with his homeworld Deep Space. Like in the film, he is imprisoned for creating Stitch, yet manages to convince Terra to break him out and rescue Stitch, then known as Experiment 626, from execution. Terra accepts, but along the way, Stitch begins to learn about friendships and bonds, and Jumba, frustrated, sets Experiment 221 on Terra, whom Terra defeats in battle. This prompts the Red Alert to go off, and Jumba flees before the security guards arrive. Later, when Aqua visits the spaceship, she is ordered to find both Jumba and Stitch, whom she finds in the docking bay. As she attempts to arrest Jumba again, Gantu appears, intending to kill them all, including Jumba, but Aqua manages to defeat him and Jumba is taken back into custody. In the game's credits, his surname is misspelled "Jukiba". Birth by Sleep would be the final time that Stiers voiced Jumba, as he would die on March 3, 2018.

Wendy Pleakley

Agent Wendy Pleakley, usually referred to mononymously by his surname Pleakley, works for the United Galactic Federation, and acts as its expert on the planet Earth, when in reality he does not know much. He reluctantly becomes Dr. Jumba Jookiba's partner when forced to assist the scientist in capturing the escaped Experiment 626 (Stitch), then later becomes his best friend and roommate when the two are stranded on Earth. His species is Plorgonarian. Pleakley is voiced by The Kids in the Hall veteran Kevin McDonald in all official Western media. In Stitch!, he is voiced in English by Ted Biaselli (except for Stitch! Perfect Memory, where an uncredited voice actor replaces him), and in Stitch & Ai, he is voiced by Lucien Dodge.

Pleakley is a thin, greenish-yellow alien with three stout legs, a wide mouth with two purple tongues, three elongated fingers on each hand, a round bald head topped with a single small antenna that acts as ear and nose, and one large eye in the middle of his face. His body shape and style of movement resembles the enchanted brooms from The Sorcerer's Apprentice sequence of Disney's Fantasia. He was once described as a "babe magnet" by his brother in the episode "Fibber", which turned out to be true when Fibber's "buzzing" lie-detector fails to go off. It is likely that his appearance is considered attractive on his home planet, although his general appearance is derisively described as a "one-eyed noodle", by both Hämsterviel and Jumba on different occasions in the movies and the series. Pleakley is shown to be effeminate and dresses in both men's and women's clothing and often wears a wig. He usually wears his Galactic Alliance uniform on official business and a muumuu while on Earth.

In "Poxy", much of the workings of Pleakley's internal system are revealed when Lilo and Stitch shrink themselves and enter it to retrieve an infectious experiment. He has no skeletal system and has an extremely small brain (smaller than his eye; Jumba once said that Pleakley has "Too much eye, not enough brain"). His clinic number is 236. In "Mr. Stenchy", his antenna is shown to be a form of sensory organ similar to a human nose (although it functions somewhat differently, allowing Pleakley to ignore or appreciate odors which a human would consider noxious or horrible). In "Yaarp", it is also shown to function as an ear. In "Spike", Nosy reveals that Pleakley dyes his antenna to match his skin because he is going prematurely orange. The episode "Fibber" reveals his given name to be Wendy, which on his home planet Plorgonar is a masculine name meaning "great warrior", although he ironically actually dislikes it despite his effeminate nature and the name's feminine connotations on Earth.

In Lilo & Stitch, he was called upon to assist mad scientist Dr. Jumba Jookiba in tracking down Experiment 626, which had escaped to the planet Earth. He and Jumba were both fired and sentenced to a prison term by the Grand Councilwoman of the planet Turo, for failing to capture Experiment 626. In the subsequent television series, Pleakley and Jumba have remained behind on Earth and become members of Lilo's ohana, or extended family.

In Lilo & Stitch: The Series, he had a brief mock engagement with Nani to placate his pushy visiting mother. In this same episode ("Fibber"), he also had a mock engagement with Jumba. Pleakley's mother is concerned that he has not found "the right girl" and that he is not married. Pleakley feels he must pretend to be married for his mother to approve and accept him. When his family arrives on Earth for the mock wedding of Nani and Pleakley, he reveals that he is happy being who he is, which includes being unmarried. After that, his family becomes more understanding of him and loves him for who he is. Gantu fell in love with him (under the influence of one of Stitch's cousins, Hunkahunka), mistaking him for a girl. An entire room full of people also fell in love with him because of the experiment at the Valentine's Dance. However, Lilo's friend (and crush) Keoni was the only one to have a real crush on him (which did not last long).

Ultimately as a reward for his help in capturing and taming Jumba's experiments, he is granted a position at Galactic Alliance Community College as Head of Earth Studies. He gets an assistant (who is excited to learn he has actually been to Earth), a new wardrobe, and the keys to the college's carpool van but is only a supervising professor and is dissatisfied with not being able to spread his knowledge of Earth and starts to miss Jumba and the rest of Lilo's family. He goes to visit Jumba in the GACC van but gets caught by Dr. Hämsterviel and nearly sent into a black hole which Stitch manages to save him, Pleakley and Jumba from. He returns to Earth for the battle with Leroy and his clones and operates the lights during Lilo and Stitch's impromptu "Aloha ʻOe" concert (accidentally blinding himself at first). He later quits his job at Galactic Alliance Community College and returns to Earth to be part of Lilo's family once again.

Gantu

Gantu (rhymes with "can too"), known as Captain Gantu in Lilo & Stitch and the end of Leroy & Stitch, is an extremely large and muscular alien from the ice-covered eighth planet of the Kreplok System with a gruff, militant personality. He resembles a bipedal whale with gray skin, sky blue eyes and pillar-like legs, wearing black battle shirt and black shorts and stands 20 feet tall. When he is seen by humans on Hawaii, he typically attempts to pass himself off as Samoan, though Lilo once told Mertle he was a dog-catcher from Nairobi, which the other girl believed. Lilo calls him "Big Dummy" for most of The Series. He is voiced by Kevin Michael Richardson in Western media, Keith Silverstein in Stitch!, and Richard Epcar in Stitch & Ai.

Gantu lacks any notable abilities, but his immense stature (he stands around 20 feet, though he is noticeably shorter in the series than in the original movie) means he has strength well above any human (or most alien species), although sufficiently less than Experiment 626 and (as seen in the episode "Spats") lost a wrestling match to an old lady, Suga Mama from The Proud Family. Aside from his lifting capacity and enormous girth, Gantu is a respected captain of the Galactic Federation (or at least he used to be), can dance the hula (as seen in the episode "Clip") and does have many skills. He is depicted in the movie being a very capable spaceship pilot, having marksman-like shooting skills and having competent leadership abilities. In Lilo & Stitch: The Series, Gantu relies primarily on his plasma pistol for combat. Besides firing plasma bolts, Gantu's pistol also can launch nets for capturing experiments. He has invented a "trog" call to capture experiments more easily (as shown in the episode "Frenchfry").

Unlike many comedic villains, Gantu is not depicted as explicitly incompetent. His plans are generally simple but reasonably solid, and his overwhelmingly consistent defeats are generally due to arrogance, incredibly bad luck, and the abilities of 626 (Stitch) rather than personal stupidity. He tends to say "Blitznak" whenever something goes wrong.

Gantu first appears during the prologue of Lilo & Stitch, where is shown to immensely dislike 626 (who dislikes Gantu in return). He holds the creature upside-down in a spaceship prison cell for transport to a desert asteroid, but 626 manages to escape. Gantu doesn't play a role for much of the film afterwards until the final act, when the Grand Councilwoman assigns him the mission to retrieve 626 on Earth after Jumba and Pleakley fail to do so. He then suddenly appears again on Kauai capturing 626 (now named "Stitch" by then) and a little girl (Lilo), putting them in a glass containment capsule on the back of his ship. Unbeknownst to him, however, Stitch escapes before the ship flies off and Lilo remains on the ship. Before gaining clearance to leave the planet, Gantu realizes what happens and goes into a dogfight between himself and Stitch along with Jumba, Pleakley, and Lilo's older sister Nani in Jumba's ship, which ends with Stitch throwing Gantu out of his ship and destroying it, although Stitch catches Gantu on the wing of Jumba's ship, preventing the captain from falling to his death. When they all meet with the Grand Councilwoman back at shore, she forcibly retires Gantu for both failing his mission and kidnapping an innocent bystander (Lilo).

In Stitch! The Movie, he is hired by Dr. Hämsterviel to retrieve Jumba's first 625 experiments. Throughout the following Lilo & Stitch: The Series, he works with the lazy sandwich-making Experiment 625 (who Gantu reluctantly accepted as a partner after the events of Stitch! The Movie) to capture experiments for Hämsterviel, fighting against—and usually losing to—Lilo and Stitch who want to tame the experiments. Gantu also clearly shows annoyance and disdain towards Hämsterviel, and in some episodes, he deliberately disobeys Hämsterviel's orders. He even tries to backstab Hämsterviel in a few episodes, most notably in "Finder" when Gantu gains an opportunity to be rehired to the Galactic Armada when Hämsterviel escapes to Earth, but in a reflection of how he was fired in the first film, he does not get his old job back after failing to capture Hämsterviel and accidentally kidnapping another innocent person (Mertle) in the process.

Gantu did not appear in Lilo & Stitch 2: Stitch Has a Glitch, despite that he is a retired captain this time.

In Leroy & Stitch, he takes a relatively small spacecraft (leaving 625 stranded on Earth), breaks Hämsterviel out of prison, and the two force Jumba in his lab to create a new experiment for Hämsterviel named "Leroy". Thanks to Leroy and his clones, Gantu and Hämsterviel then capture Stitch and Pleakley and send them (alongside Jumba) hurtling towards a black hole in Pleakley's ship. Gantu, Hämsterviel, and the Leroys then take over the United Galactic Federation and later capture Lilo and a newly reformed 625 (now named "Reuben"). However, Hämsterviel decides that his Leroy army is superior to having Gantu and fires him, prompting Gantu to quickly join Lilo's side. He, Lilo, and Reuben then join up with Stitch, Jumba, and Pleakley (who managed to escape the black hole earlier) and return to Earth where Gantu assists the heroes in preventing Hämsterviel and the Leroy army from destroying the experiments. After Hämsterviel's defeat, Gantu gets reinstated as the Captain of the Galactic Armada, which he accepts on the condition of Reuben being assigned as his galley officer.

In Stitch!, Gantu appears working for Dr. Hämsterviel again like in Lilo & Stitch: The Series. In the English dub of the anime, it was explained that—prior to the events of the series—he and Reuben were dishonorably discharged for Gantu's poor karaoke singing at a Galactic Federation party. In Stitch & Ai, Gantu reappears still working for the Galactic Federation. Since the show clearly establishes through flashbacks that the events of the original Lilo & Stitch film still happened, and Gantu was out of the Galactic Armada between the end of that film up until the end of Leroy & Stitch, this places Stitch & Ai as taking place after the events of Leroy & Stitch.

Gantu appears in Kingdom Hearts Birth by Sleep, along with his homeworld, Deep Space. Much like in the film, he is placed in charge of tracking down Stitch and Jumba once the escape from their holding cells thanks to Terra, but due to his inability to fight the Unversed with his weaponry, the Grand Councilwoman takes him off the mission in favour of Aqua, much to his chagrin. Out of spite, he finds Jumba, Stitch and Aqua in the docking bay with the intent of killing them all, but he is defeated by Aqua and demoted by the Grand Councilwoman back to patrol. Later, as he prepares to eject Stitch to Earth, Stitch escapes just as Ventus comes aboard the ship. Gantu confronts Ventus, but is forced to look for Stitch. He destroys Stitch's bond charm, enraging Stitch greatly, but loses him when he and Ventus team up to destroy an Unversed which has boarded the ship. After the battle, Gantu corners them and prepares to execute them, but Stitch knocks him over and flees with Ventus. Gantu sounds the Red Alert, but Stitch escapes into Hyperspace.

Mertle Edmonds

Mildred Pearl "Mertle" Edmonds is Lilo's main rival. She is voiced by Miranda Paige Walls in the original film and Lilo & Stitch: Trouble in Paradise, then by Liliana Mumy in the following sequels and television series.

Mertle is established as Lilo's ex-friend at the beginning of Lilo & Stitch, where she is introduced as a popular girl and the leader of a clique composed of herself and three other girls in the hālau hula. Mertle calls Lilo "Weirdlo" and refuses to include her in the girls' activities. Mertle and the other girls express fear and disgust of Lilo and her things, such as her doll Scrump and Stitch. Mertle takes great pleasure in putting down, insulting, bullying, and making fun of Lilo, in which Lilo sometimes responds (quite violently) by hitting her, pulling her hair, and biting her.

She became a recurring character in Lilo & Stitch: The Series. Throughout the series, it is established that she is from a relatively wealthy family and is a spoiled brat who lives with her mother. In one of the episodes, it is revealed that she keeps Gigi (Experiment 007) as a pet, but does not realize she is an experiment. She is associated with Dr. Hämsterviel. In the episode "Finder", she mistakes Dr. Hämsterviel for a gerbil and keeps him as a pet for a short time, then in "Shush" when her friends break up with her after Lilo wrongly thought she hated them she teams up with Dr. Hämsterviel, who apparently turns her into an android in order to catch all the other experiments in place of Gantu but was rescued by Lilo and Stitch, who took her to Jumba to de-robot her. Lilo tries to be friends with Mertle in several episodes, but this usually just results in even more social rejection. She is rejected by her friends in "Tank" and teams up with Stitch to capture the experiment. They fail and are captured but manage to escape in Stitch's dune buggy while Gantu gets the experiment. She initially tries to tell her friends about it, but stops and becomes friends with them again.

Mertle plays a key role in Lilo & Stitch 2: Stitch Has a Glitch, as one of the entrants in the hula contest that is central to the film's plot.

Mertle also seems to try to prevent other children from befriending Lilo; when Victoria moved to Kokaua Town, Mertle tried to make friends with her so she would not be Lilo's friend. However, despite her ongoing attempts to steal Victoria away from Lilo, Victoria genuinely likes Lilo, and remains one of her few friends. She also has a small role in the final film of the franchise, Leroy & Stitch where she is captured by Leroy and is present at the final battle where although she does not fight, she is nearly killed and learns her dog is an alien experiment and can talk. She later becomes part of Lilo's ohana, supposedly at Gigi's insistence.

Mertle has a well-off but technically "broken" family. They own several homes, which they run as bed and breakfasts, as well as three computers. Mertle's mother, who looks very much like her daughter, is a successful realtor who is a kind woman who is often oblivious to the trouble Lilo and Stitch cause around her and believes that Lilo is one of Mertle's good friends. She also has an Aunt Stacy who is a Hollywood producer and cannot remember Mertle's name. In "Yapper", Mertle adopts Experiment 007 and names it "Gigi". The whereabouts of Mertle's father, Karl, is unknown. Mertle dedicates a hula to his souvenir shop in Lilo & Stitch 2. It seems that Karl left his family some time after that because he is missing throughout the entire series. In Leroy & Stitch, Mertle tells Lilo that her dad used to say "Once a weirdo, always a weirdo", which may explain why Mertle considers Lilo weird. Yuki comments that she did not know Mertle had a dad (much to Mertle's annoyance), and then adds "just like Mertle's dad!" after Mertle tells Lilo that Stitch is not coming back.

Mertle also appears in a Disney Adventures comic that was published before the first Lilo & Stitch film was released, where she is named "Jenny". It is possible that she did not have an established name when the comic was published, or that she was renamed during the film's production.

Mertle's three friends are Yuki (Lili Ishida), Elena (Jillian Henry), and Teresa (Kali Whitehurst).

Cobra Bubbles

Cobra Bubbles is working as a social worker at the time of the original film. He is called to Nani's house to determine the fate of her guardianship over her sister Lilo, only to find Lilo home by herself, the front door nailed shut, and Nani trying to get in via the dog door. After a brief assessment, during which Lilo misinterprets Nani's hand signals, Cobra concludes that Nani is not doing a good enough job. When Nani is fired because of Stitch's violent behavior, he informs her that he can not ignore her being unemployed and gives her three days to get a new job. Cobra's subsequent encounter with the family's new "dog", Stitch, also proves to be less than favorable (upon meeting him, Stitch promptly throws a dictionary at Cobra Bubbles' head). He is voiced in the films by Ving Rhames, in Lilo & Stitch: The Series by Gantu's voice actor Kevin Michael Richardson, and in Stitch & Ai by Richard Epcar (who is not credited in the role).

After Cobra sees Lilo nearly drown when surfing with Nani, David, and Stitch, he decides to take Lilo away the next day, though he is sad about it. When Jumba Jookiba and Pleakley forcibly enter the house to capture Stitch, Lilo phones Cobra and proclaims that "aliens are attacking my house". After the house is destroyed by Jumba's questionable tactics, Cobra arrives to take Lilo away, presumably to a foster home, however, Lilo runs off and is subsequently captured by Gantu.

Cobra is a former CIA agent and was involved in an incident at Roswell in 1973, presumably through which he knows the Grand Councilwoman. He mentions that he saved the earth from an alien race by convincing them that the mosquito was an endangered species, and that Earth should be turned into a wildlife preserve. When the Grand Councilwoman declares that Nani and Lilo are to be caretakers of Stitch during his exile on Earth, she also implies that Cobra Bubbles is not to divide but instead protect the family. Cobra Bubbles appears to have become a close friend of the family if the end of the first film is any indication. He is seen attending one of Lilo's birthday parties and also appears in two of Lilo's photographs. In one photo, he is seen watching a movie with several members of Lilo's family. In another, he is seen serving Lilo's family turkey at a Thanksgiving dinner.

Cobra appears in a few episodes of Lilo & Stitch: The Series and did not appear in Lilo & Stitch 2: Stitch Has a Glitch. However, his short appearance in Stitch! The Movie, chronologically taking place just before the beginning of the TV series, indicates that he is likely in regular contact with the Grand Councilwoman. He is only heard over the telephone in Leroy & Stitch. He seems to still work for the government in an underground almost men in black way, though he claims just to be a social worker, such as in an episode of the show where he gathers "essential" members of the populace for transport to safety shelters when an asteroid is on a collision course with the planet. Cobra also adopted Shush (Experiment 234).

Cobra made his first new appearance in years in Stitch & Ai, wherein its second episode ("Teacher's Pet") it's revealed that he's observing Stitch from a distance along with other CIA members and relaying information to the Grand Councilwoman. He appears again in the eleventh episode ("Nuo Opera") where he radios the Galactic Alliance to apprehend Stitch having witnessed his misbehavior, only to then call it off after seeing him remedy his mistake.

Cobra is also shown to be very strong; in Lilo & Stitch, he pulls open a door despite the fact that it is nailed shut.

Grand Councilwoman

The Grand Councilwoman is the leader of the United Galactic Federation. Others occasionally refer to her as 'Your Majesty' and 'Your Highness', and on the whole, she seems both reasonable and well-intentioned, although, like many members of the United Galactic Federation, she knows almost nothing about Earth or its inhabitants. She is of an unknown species by name, but she seems to be reminiscent of a grey alien, with hoof-shaped feet, big eyes, and a big head. She was voiced by Australian actress Zoe Caldwell. It seems, that the Grand Councilwoman has a status as the supreme ruler of the galactic federation (similar to an empress in an empire).

In Lilo & Stitch, the Grand Councilwoman was first seen in a courtroom with the other Galactic Leaders during the trial against Jumba Jookiba. After asking Jumba's genetic creation, Experiment 626, if he could show some good in him — and his subsequent use of an apparent (alienistic) obscene phrase "Meega, nala kweesta!" (a Tantalog phrase so vulgar that a robot in the Galactic Council vomits, and Jumba insisted he did not teach 626 the phrase) in a show of refusal to do so — the Grand Councilwoman sentenced the Experiment to banishment on a desert asteroid and Jumba to prison. However, 626 escapes in a police cruiser and she asks if it would be possible to just go to Earth and retrieve him. Agent Pleakley tells her that the planet is a protected mosquito preserve and she later allows Pleakley and Jumba to retrieve 626. During the course of the film, The Councilwoman makes frequent calls to Pleakley, questioning what they are doing and why Experiment 626 has not been captured yet. In her last call to Pleakley, she loses patience and fires him and Jumba, sending Captain Gantu to finish the mission. At the end of the film, she finds that 626 (now named Stitch) found his own family and has changed for the better. She is reluctantly about to take Stitch to serve out his sentence, when she learns that Lilo and Nani paid money for Stitch and therefore legally own him, giving the Councilwoman a legal loophole she could use. She happily allows him to stay with the Pelekais in exile on Earth and announces that the family is under the protection of the Galactic Alliance, saying they will be checking in on them every now and then. She also revealed that she had previously met Cobra Bubbles during the Roswell case, commenting that he used to have hair.

The Grand Councilwoman made a brief appearance at the ending of Stitch! The Movie to assist in the capture of Dr. Jacques von Hämsterviel but due to the lack of need for her in the plot of Lilo & Stitch 2: Stitch Has a Glitch she was not included in that film. She returned for one episode of Lilo & Stitch: The Series ("Finder") where she offers Gantu his old job back if he captures Dr. Hämsterviel (who escaped from prison to Earth in the episode), but she revokes her offer when she finds that he (accidentally) captured another human girl, Mertle Edmonds. In Leroy & Stitch, she is seen making Stitch a Captain of the Galactic Alliance, then again briefly as Dr. Hämsterviel's secretary, then giving awards when she resumes her position at the end.

The Grand Councilwoman also appears in Kingdom Hearts Birth by Sleep along with her homeworld, Deep Space. Like in the film, she sends Jumba to prison for creating Stitch and orders Stitch's execution, but over the course of the game, she gradually begins to change her mind after seeing Stitch's encounter with Aqua and his changing personality. On Aqua's request, the Grand Councilwoman reconsiders executing Stitch, but still sentences him to exile, although Stitch manages to escape with Ventus' help. She also demotes Captain Gantu to patrol when he goes rogue and attempts to kill Jumba, Stitch and Aqua.

David Kawena

David Kawena is Nani's boyfriend. He is voiced by Jason Scott Lee in the original film and Lilo & Stitch 2: Stitch Has a Glitch and Dee Bradley Baker in Lilo & Stitch: The Series and its films. David is a great surfer. Like Nani, he also has trouble finding employment. Very easygoing, he is a close and supportive friend to both Pelekai sisters, having helped them out several times; in the original film, for example, he offers Lilo and Nani to go spend time together surfing when both girls felt defeated in trying and failing to accomplish their goals (Nani finding a job and Lilo taming Stitch). He is also only one of four humans (the other three being Victoria, Cobra Bubbles, and later Mertle) aside from Lilo's family who is aware of the aliens and experiments.

Mrs. Hasagawa

Lynne Hasagawa, usually referred to as Mrs. Hasagawa, is a little old lady with grey hair and wears glasses, and is the owner of the town's fruit stand. In the first half of episode #220, "Mrs. Hasagawa's Cats", she keeps many experiments, thinking that they are cats. It is not known if she, being the caretaker of several alien lifeforms, is under the official protection of the United Galactic Federation as Lilo and Nani are. The experiments are: 002 (Doubledip), 031 (Gotchu), 044 (Forehead), 051 (Hocker), 077 (Zawp), 111 (Mulch), 134 (Shredder), 214 (Pix), 288 (Boomer), 320 (Cloudy), 358 (Manners), 507 (Woody), 521 (Wrapper), 533 (Blowhard), and 566 (Derrick). In the episode with Checkers (029), she is called a troublemaker. A Mrs. Hasagawa quote: "But you know what they say about happiness — it's like the Parubian Monkey flu... very contagious!" Stitch mispronounces her name as "Hasagasawa". In the crossover episode with American Dragon: Jake Long, Lao Shi falls in love with her.

Other characters

Moses Puloki: Lilo's hula teacher. He is very patient with his young students and is very tolerant of their antics. However, he is often exasperated by the way Mertle and her friends disrespect Lilo. Lilo and her classmates often call Moses "Kumu", Hawaiian for teacher. Lilo oddly calls him "Mr. Petuli" in the Lilo & Stitch: The Series episode "Cannonball", though she later refers to him by his given name Moses in the same episode. He is voiced by Kunewa Mook, who is a kumu hula in real life.
Elena, Teresa, and Yuki: They are three girls that always accompany Mertle and mock Lilo with her. They usually travel in a group and usually say a drawn-out, sarcastic "Yeah!" in unison when agreeing with Mertle on something. They would actually like Lilo if Mertle didn't make them think they didn't, and have actually sided with Lilo a few times, such as in the episode "Tank" when Lilo wins them tickets to the Elizabethan Fair, and in "Shush" when they break up with Mertle after Lilo wrongly thought she hated them.
Elena is Caucasian like Mertle, and has blonde hair in pigtails head together by blue hair ties. She often wears a pink tank top that exposes her stomach, blue shorts, and purple flip-flops. She is the shortest girl in Mertle's posse. She is voiced by Jillian Henry.
Teresa appears to be of Hawaiian descent like Lilo, and has wavy dark brown hair with a purple headband in it. She often wears a lavender short-sleeved shirt with a V-neck, purple shorts, and black flip-flops. She is the tallest girl in Mertle's posse. She vaguely has an interest in technology, as she shares a drawing of a robot doing hula in "Cannonball" and uses an internet-connected laptop and wireless voice communication to help Mertle cheat in the trivia contest in "Spike". She is voiced by Kali Whitehurst. Moses strangely calls Teresa "Aleka" in Lilo & Stitch 2: Stitch Has a Glitch; Lilo & Stitch: The Series executive producer and writer Jess Winfield stated that the Lilo & Stitch 2 production team at Disneytoon Studios decided to disregard the established continuity of The Series for their film, which included the hula girls' names.
Yuki is Asian, possibly of Japanese descent, and has short, straight brown hair. She often wears a light green short-sleeved shirt, olive shorts and dark olive flip-flops. She expresses an interest in ice hockey in several episodes of The Series. She is voiced by Lili Ishida.
Rescue Lady: The operator of Aloha Animal Rescue, Kokaua Town's animal shelter where Lilo adopts Stitch. She has red hair and wears glasses and green overalls. Her real name, according to Lilo's pink slip showing her ownership of Stitch, is Susan Hegarty, which is the name of the real life vocal coach who voiced her in the original film. She also makes brief appearances in three episodes of Lilo & Stitch: The Series, in which she is voiced by Grey DeLisle.
Ice Cream Man: An unnamed, obese man with sunglasses, swimsuit, and a sunburn around his body except for an area on his torso where he wore an A-shirt. He is a running gag throughout the Lilo & Stitch franchise. Whenever he appears, he drops his ice cream from its cone before he can finish it. This character has never spoken in the series except saying "Whoa!" when he tripped over a pod. He also cries after being turned into a baby by Experiment 151 (Babyfier). His real eyes can be seen in "Swirly". Voiced, briefly, by Frank Welker.

Characters introduced in Stitch: Experiment 626

Chopsuey (X-621)

Chopsuey (Experiment 621) is one of Stitch's cousins. A green, skinny Stitch look-alike with a spiky yellow mohawk and two prominent fangs jutting from his lower jaw, he has all of Stitch's powers and is jealous of all the attention Stitch gets. He steals the DNA that Stitch collects for Jumba, mutating into a stronger form. He was voiced in the game by Frank Welker.

621 does not appear in any of the franchise's sequel films or television series. He was named "Chopsuey" at some point during the events of Lilo & Stitch: The Series according to the list of experiments seen in the credits of Leroy & Stitch.

Dr. Habbitrale

Dr. Habbitrale is one of many rivals of Dr. Jumba Jookiba. He shares a similar appearance to Dr. Hämsterviel, appearing to be of the same rodent-like alien species as him. He was voiced by James Arnold Taylor.

Characters introduced in Stitch! The Movie

Dr. Hämsterviel

Dr. Jacques von Hämsterviel is voiced by Jeff Bennett in Lilo & Stitch: The Series and its films Stitch! The Movie and Leroy & Stitch, while Kirk Thornton voiced him in the Stitch! anime. Hämsterviel is a diminutive albino alien scientist who desires to conquer the galaxy. He is two feet tall with a rodent-like appearance with white fur, red eyes, a hamster-like body, a gerbil-like lower body, a rabbit-like face, rabbit-like ears, and wears a red cape with a golden 'H' brooch on the front. The former lab partner of Doctor Jumba Jookiba, he now seeks to capture the genetic experiments he helped to create through financing, with the help of the retired Captain Gantu, before Lilo and Stitch. The few times Gantu is able to capture an experiment are coupled with comedic moments, usually at the expense of Hämsterviel.

Hämsterviel primarily speaks in an exaggerated French and German accents, similar to the French knight from Monty Python and the Holy Grail. He has a highly inflated ego and is rude to everyone he sees, usually yelling at others with often poorly-constructed and redundant insults. Much to his chagrin, a vast majority of the universe mispronounces his name, usually as "Hamsterwheel" or "Hamsterveal", but on some occasions, other variations have been used, such as "Gerbilviel". He also does not like his actual given name, Rupert, which was revealed by Nosy (X-199). He is also often mistaken for a gerbil-like creature, despite his insistence that he is hamster-like (though due to his long ears, buck teeth, and triangular nose he looks more like a rabbit).

Hämsterviel usually works from his 'prison cell' which he has set up to be a laboratory, complete with communication and teleportation systems. During one furlough from prison, he came to Earth and disguised himself as a human, trying to trick aliens (especially Stitch) into working for him. Several times Hämsterviel has been personally affected by the experiments. On one occasion he suffers amnesia and Gantu mocks him by making up embarrassing lies to fill in the blanks.

Like Jumba, Hämsterviel is stated to be an evil genius as well, having graduated from the same "Evil Genius University" as his former partner prior to the events of the franchise. Hämsterviel has shown signs of his own high levels of intelligence, including having managed to escape from prison on his own, constructing a plasma blaster using only the items from an Earth-based hamster cage, as well as the fact that he secretly modified his prison cell to be his laboratory.

In Leroy & Stitch, Hämsterviel escapes prison and forces Jumba to create a new experiment, "Leroy". He then repeatedly clones Leroy and uses the clones to take over the Galactic Alliance, firing Gantu afterward for his incompetence. This proves to be the key to his downfall, as Gantu breaks Lilo and 625—now named Reuben—out of prison. When Hämsterviel goes to watch Leroy and his clones destroy the other experiments, his plan is thwarted by the arrival of the reformed Gantu, Lilo, Stitch, Reuben, Jumba, and Pleakley, who team up with all the other experiments and defeat Leroy. After Lilo, Stitch, and Reuben defeat all of the Leroys with "Aloha Oe", the remaining angry experiments toss him around like a beach ball causing him to yell "I am not beach ball like, I am hamster like!" Hämsterviel is sent back to prison afterward, with all the Leroys in the cells around him.

In the Stitch! anime series, Hämsterviel is seen out of prison residing in a laboratory hideout on an asteroid, with Gantu and Reuben working for him again. He now goes out in the open more often to fight against Stitch and his new friend Yuna. He also has a number of experiments in his possession and often sends them out to fight for him; he states in an episode of the English dub that he kidnapped them from Kauai and reverted them back to evil using a recording of Angel's siren song. Additionally, during the anime, primarily its third season ~Best Friends Forever~, he "transmutates" a number of experiments to enhance or change their abilities. During the Madhouse-produced first two seasons, he goes after Stitch as he tries to take Stitch's wish for "ultimate power" from the Chitama Spiritual Stone for himself; he nearly succeeds in the two-part first season finale "Stitch vs. Hämsterviel" by mind-controlling Jumba to take the Stone's magical energy and transfer it via machine into himself, making him incredibly strong. However, Stitch is eventually loaned much of the Stone's power to protect it and defeats Hämsterviel, sending Hämsterviel, Gantu, and Reuben to Galactic Prison, although the trio escapes imprisonment in "BooGoo", the first episode of the second season ~The Mischievous Alien's Great Adventure~. In the third season, he partners with Delia, an alien woman introduced in that season whom he apparently had a history with, who supplies him with a space station orbiting Earth. Hämsterviel tries various schemes to kidnap Stitch on her behalf and send him to her, but they always fail, leading her to torture him after every failure. At the end of that season, he, Gantu, Reuben, and Delia all get arrested by the Grand Councilwoman. He also appears in the two post-series specials Stitch and the Planet of Sand and Stitch! Perfect Memory, no longer working with Delia and having escaped prison with Gantu and Reuben again prior to each special, though they all get re-arrested again at the end each time.

Hämsterviel does not return in the Chinese series Stitch & Ai except for a brief cameo in the third episode "Gotcha!", where he is shown imprisoned on a volcanic planet doing hard labor. His cameo implies that the series takes place on a different post-Leroy timeline from the anime, since Gantu remains in his returned position as Captain of the Galactic Armada in this series. Hämsterviel also briefly appeared in a Disney Tsum Tsum-based side story of the alternate universe manga Stitch & the Samurai, where he sends Leroy after Stitch; his and Leroy's part of the side story was not published outside of Japan.

Hämsterviel makes costumed character appearances at Tokyo Disneyland and occasionally at Disneyland Paris. He also appeared in a 2014 Disney Villains-themed event at Walt Disney World called "Villains Unleashed" alongside Gantu, marking the first time that either character physically appear in an American Disney park.

Reuben (X-625)

Reuben (Experiment 625) is one of the experiments created by Jumba, and one of Stitch's cousins. Reuben has every ability Stitch has (along with a much better fluency in English, speaking with a Brooklyn accent) but he prefers to make sandwiches than use his powers. He is voiced by Rob Paulsen in the films and Lilo & Stitch: The Series, and by Dave Wittenberg in the Stitch! anime's English dub. Although the character's canonical debut was in Stitch! The Movie, he first appeared in prequel comics published in Disney Adventures before the release of the original film.

In spite of having all the powers of Stitch, Reuben is incredibly lazy. He constantly insults Gantu's bumbling nature but secretly sees him as his best friend. He can be considered somewhat of a coward, especially when Gantu forces him to battle Stitch on occasion. Unlike Gantu, however, he shows no fear of Dr. Hämsterviel who apparently resents Reuben because of his laziness. He also has a rather odd love for sandwiches. Most of the time, he is seen with either a finished sandwich in his hand or making one. His sandwiches are apparently delicious as even Gantu asks for some. Aside from this, Reuben is incredibly intelligent, especially when it comes to dealing with experiments. Although he was the second to last of the original 626 genetic experiments to be created, Reuben has excessive knowledge of every experiment, even the ones created far before his time.

Experiment 625 was the 625th genetic experiment created by Jumba with Hämsterviel's funding. He was designed for Stitch's purpose (mischief and mass destruction) but was considered a failed experiment due to his lazy nature. 625 and the previous 624 experiments were deactivated and smuggled to Earth by Jumba during his mission to capture Experiment 626. In the prequel comics, before Stitch's creation and when Jumba was struggling with creating his ultimate monster, Reuben served as Jumba's primary assistant in the labs, though this mostly involved him making sandwiches for his master. When Stitch first gets loose on Turo, Reuben comes with Jumba to help him track the creature down, but eventually, the arrest would come and Reuben would be podded. Reuben appears in a teal blue color in the prequel comics. This blue color was still kept in the early comics based on the show, persisting even in reprints.

In Stitch! The Movie, while Jumba and Pleakley were fighting over the experiment pod container, unseen to them, 625's experiment pod slipped out. Gantu later discovered the pod while abducting Jumba and took it with him back to Hämsterviel's ship. When Jumba refused to reveal the location of the other experiment pods, Gantu and Hämsterviel, unaware of 625's lazy nature, decided to activate Experiment 625 and use him to torture Jumba. However, Gantu and Hämsterviel were awestruck to discover 625's lazy nature. 625 later frequently attempted to gain new bologna for his sandwiches, until he was trapped on Earth after Gantu's ship crashed with Gantu and 625 on board.

In Lilo & Stitch: The Series, he is still stranded along with Gantu. 625 turns out to be quite intelligent and gives plenty of information about the experiments to Gantu. In the series, 625 was once commanded by Gantu to battle Stitch, but due to his lazy nature, did not fight and was easily beaten. Ironically, he used his powers twice in the series when he climbed up the spaceship window and kicked Gantu along the beach. He is portrayed as Gantu's wise-cracking sidekick and often tags along during experiment hunting. In the episode "Mr. Stenchy," Reuben was actually jealous of Gantu's affection towards the newfound experiment Mr. Stenchy. Throughout the series, Experiment 625 serves as Gantu's reluctant sidekick, although is usually no help or messes up Gantu's plans, or even helps Lilo and Stitch against him on some occasions.

625 plays a large role in Leroy & Stitch. Gantu abandons 625 to break Hämsterviel out of prison, leaving him incredibly upset. Meanwhile, Stitch returns to space to become the captain of the B.R.B ship, and Lilo becomes lonely. She goes over to Gantu's now junkyard ship to ask 625 to use the video phone, and even makes a sandwich as a peace offering. He initially denies being that he's too busy turning the ship into a sandwich shop. Lilo suddenly notices that she's never named him (he was still 625 to this point). After a few failed attempts, they finally agree to Reuben, after the Reuben sandwich. Now feeling the "aloha spirit," Reuben allows Lilo to use the phone. After the call, Lilo finds out that the Stitch aboard the BRB is actually an evil clone. She asks Reuben for help in saving Stitch, but he claims it's not their problem. Lilo then enlightens him on how he could do whatever Stitch can, prompting him to reveal his incredible powers and fix the ship to make it fully operational again. Together, Reuben and Lilo head over to Planet Turo where they find Hämsterviel, now ruler of the galaxy. Hämsterviel orders Gantu to arrest the two and then fires Gantu in the process. Gantu, out of resentment of Dr. Hämsterviel's endless abuse ending in firing him, switches sides, resulting in Reuben and Lilo's rescue. They all meet with Stitch, Jumba and Pleakley and quickly head to Earth to save the captive experiments. During the battle between the experiments and the Leroy army, Reuben throws sandwiches onto the floor, causing the Leroys to slip. When the Leroys, after a few victories won by the Experiments, gained the upper hand in the battle, Lilo, Stitch, Reuben and several other experiments performed the song "Aloha ʻOe", which caused the entire Leroy army to shut down due to the original's failsafe. Reuben joins them for the song by playing the saxophone. As a reward, Reuben was given the honor of being the Galley Officer and work alongside Gantu to protect the galaxy.

In the Stitch! anime series, Reuben tags along with Gantu, who rejoins Hämsterviel. During the series, Reuben isn't much of an enemy to Stitch even visiting him sometimes. During "Reuben's Rice Balls", he becomes fond of Japanese rice balls. In spite of his neutrality, Reuben tags along with Gantu and Hämsterviel during the many villainous plots, although he has stated that he doesn't really care who wins. In one episode, "Reuben 2.0", Reuben was used in a plot to capture Angel. However, an impressive battle with Stitch ends with Reuben falling into a food stand, having him remember his real-life goal—to make and eat sandwiches.

Reuben makes occasional costumed character appearances at Tokyo Disneyland and Disneyland Paris, usually in parades along with many other experiments. He makes an appearance in Lilo & Stitch's Big Panic on a float with the villains of his franchise. He made an extremely brief, non-speaking cameo appearance in Stitch's Great Escape! at the Magic Kingdom, when Gantu gave guests a quick look at the "criminals" of the galaxy; Reuben's name is rendered as "SixTwoFive" in the franchise's fictional Tantalog script, since the ride opened before Leroy & Stitch was released.

Sparky (X-221)

Sparky (Experiment 221) is one of the experiments created by Jumba, and one of Stitch's cousins. He can control electricity and move around with it as a method of propulsion, sometimes causing shorted circuits. He is voiced by Frank Welker, while he is voiced by Steven Blum in the anime's dubbed version. His "one true place" is a disused lighthouse on Kauai, which he can power up for full operation.

He also appears in the video game Kingdom Hearts: Birth by Sleep. He has also made costumed character appearances in Tokyo Disneyland and Disneyland Paris, usually with other experiments.

Jumba's genetic experiments (Stitch's cousins)

The genetic experiments (or simply experiments) are genetically engineered alien creatures created by Dr. Jumba Jookiba who are featured throughout the franchise, of which Stitch (Experiment 626) is among them. The experiments, made by Jumba with funding provided by his former partner-in-crime Dr. Jacques von Hämsterviel, were primarily designed for causing evil deeds in a variety of forms, ranging from mere annoyances to planetary destruction. Although at least one of them have technically appeared in virtually every Lilo & Stitch-related media—mainly through Stitch—the collective experiments were only a main focus in Lilo & Stitch: The Series (and its pilot and finale films) and the Stitch! anime series. The experiments, in general, were first introduced in the Lilo & Stitch prequel comics shown in Disney Adventures magazine and in the PlayStation 2 prequel video game Disney's Stitch: Experiment 626, which were released before the original film's premiere, but they did not make their official debut in the animated continuity until Stitch! The Movie.

The pronunciation of each experiment's number is typically by digit (e.g. Stitch is "Experiment Six-Two-Six"), with the only known exceptions being those whose numbers are divisible by 100 (e.g. Spooky is "Experiment Three Hundred") and Experiment 619/Splodyhead (who was referred and called to by Jumba as "Experiment Six-Nineteen" in the episode "Splodyhead"). According to some episodes of Lilo & Stitch: The Series and the "wanted posters" in the exit halls of Stitch's Great Escape!, the official abbreviation of "Experiment" (when referring to a specific one of such) is "X-" (X with a hyphen); in this format, Stitch's number would be abbreviated as "X-626" (pronounced as "ex six-two-six").

The experiments serve as the main plot devices of Lilo & Stitch: The Series, where Lilo and Stitch have to find the experiments (who are initially shown as dehydrated pods that are activated in water), capture them, name them, and rehabilitate them by putting them in occupations where they can use their abilities to help out society (referred to by Lilo as the places where they truly belong or "one true places"). Stitch, inspired by Hawaiian terminology, refers to nearly all of his fellow experiments as his "cousins" (Angel, his girlfriend, being the lone exception) and considers them all a part of his ohana. The original 626 numbered experiments, ranging from X-001/Shrink to X-626/Stitch, had their given names shown alongside Leroy & Stitchs credits.

About 100 experiments were designed for Lilo & Stitch: The Series, which initially wasn't going to feature the other 625 experiments made before Stitch. On a TV Tome thread held by Lilo & Stitch: The Series executive producer Jess Winfield (under his TV Tome username "jesstifer"), he stated that during the show's development, Walt Disney Television Animation artist and director Steve Lyons suggested that Lilo and Stitch would hunt down various creatures that a villain would make from cloning Stitch. Over time, the idea of the Stitch clones would change to the 625 experiments before Stitch after someone else suggested them instead. Winfield didn't remember who first thought up of the idea of using the other 625 experiments, although he believed it was either himself, fellow executive producer Bobs Gannaway, or then-president of Walt Disney Television Animation Barry Blumberg.

Stitch & Ai—which does not feature any of the original experiments besides Stitch—features an entirely new set of experiments made during the events of that series by Jumba, who bases them on creatures found in Chinese mythology that he read about on ancient scrolls.

Characters introduced in Lilo & Stitch: The Series

Angel (X-624)

Angel (Experiment 624) is a pink female experiment who is Stitch's love interest. Stitch is madly in love with her and she shares the same feeling; they call each other their "boojiboo", a word in their Tantalog language that is analogous to "mate". Angel can hypnotize others (mainly experiments made before her) by singing a siren song that converts them from good to evil, or vice versa when she sings backwards. However, she can not hypnotize experiments created after her, including Reuben (625) and Stitch. In the anime series Stitch!, she is a famous singer who triumphs worldwide. She is voiced by Tara Strong in Lilo & Stitch: The Series and Leroy & Stitch, while she is voiced by Kate Higgins in the anime's English dub. She was designed by Jose Zelaya, an El Salvador-born character designer working at Disney Television Animation.

In her eponymous debut episode, she first meets Lilo when they bump into each other while Gantu was seemingly looking for the experiment. After Lilo and Stitch chase after the pink experiment into an alleyway, 624 charms Stitch, easily making him lovestruck and convinced she is good. Lilo, on the other hand, was suspicious of 624 and sarcastically names her "Angel" (likely a reference to the lyrics of "(You're the) Devil in Disguise" by Elvis Presley). Upon reuniting with Jumba, Angel sings her siren song in his ear to make him truly evil again, causing him to lie to Lilo about the experiment's function, then gives Angel access to his computer when Lilo and Stitch leave his room. Angel was using the duo to infiltrate their home and use the computer's database to find rehabilitated experiments, all in order to hypnotize them to becoming evil again and bring them to Gantu so they can be brought to Hämsterviel. While she sleeps in a basket in the ohanas laundry room overnight (Lilo was unwilling to let Angel sleep with Stitch), Stitch wakes her up with a bouquet of flowers; she tries to convert him with her song from there, but only gets a compliment for her singing from him in return. She later runs off to convert several experiments to evil again, while Stitch tries and fails to gain back her attention. At night, she runs up Mount Waialeale with Stitch following her to meet up with Gantu in a spaceship ready to send experiments to Hämsterviel. In the ship, she and Gantu trap Stitch inside and release several experiments to knock him out. However, feeling guilty for betraying the one person who was genuinely kind to her, she sings her song backwards to convert the experiments back to good before Stitch gets pummeled, and they bring the spaceship crashing back down to Earth. Just as she and Stitch free the experiments, and Lilo finally accepts her into the ohana for her redemption, Gantu captures Angel as punishment for her betrayal towards him and runs off with her.

In "Remmy", she makes a minor appearance in a dream sequence, as she was still under Gantu's captivity at the time of the episode.

In "Snafu", while she was still captured, 625 tricks her into singing her song backwards to supposedly turn him good, secretly recording her so that Gantu can play the song in its normal form to convert the rehabilitated experiments back to evil again. However, the plan fails when Experiment 120 (later named "Snafu") steals and runs off with the recording. Meanwhile, Lilo and Stitch plan a rescue mission to free her and the other experiments that Gantu captured, but Snafu foils them as they infiltrate Gantu's ship. After Stitch professes his love for Angel, she breaks out of her containment capsule, frees Stitch out of his, and after hugging each other, they free Lilo and the remaining experiments. Lilo, Stitch, Angel, and the other experiments then escape the ship, and afterwards Stitch and Angel go out on a date.

Angel makes a minor appearance in Leroy & Stitch. After being captured by Leroy and sent to a stadium along with the other experiments to be destroyed by Hämsterviel, she participates in the ensuing battle against Hämsterviel's Leroy army. In one scene, when four Leroy clones surround Stitch, Angel notices him in trouble and quickly takes down the clones by using martial arts moves, then blows an air kiss towards a grateful Stitch in return. She later gets pinned down by a Leroy clone before Lilo, Stitch, and Reuben perform "Aloha Oe" to shut the Leroy army down. She also appears in the final group shot of the Pelekai ohana, standing on a handrail close to Lilo's camera.

Angel becomes a much more recurring character in the Stitch! anime series, having become a successful pop singer since the events of Leroy & Stitch. In this series, she is shown to have gained a spoiled diva attitude, likely due to her life as a pop star, and an affinity for romantic clichés. Despite her continued love of Stitch, she became romantically attracted to someone else at least three separate times, once with Experiment 627 when he disguised himself as a human duke, once with Reuben when Hämsterviel upgraded his self-confidence and changed his personality to a delinquent archetype (à la James Dean in Rebel Without a Cause), and briefly with Kijimunaa when he accidentally wins a fight against Stitch, although she returns to loving Stitch in all three instances.

She also previously made an extremely brief, non-speaking cameo appearance in Stitch's Great Escape! at the Magic Kingdom, when Gantu gave guests a quick look at the "criminals" of the galaxy.

Despite her limited appearances in Lilo & Stitch: The Series, Angel became one of the franchise's most popular characters; a Disney Channel online poll held in Spring 2004 showed that Angel was voted by the show's viewers as their 1 favorite experiment and episode from the first season of the series.
As a result of her popularity, she began making costumed character appearances in the Disney Parks in 2006, mostly at Tokyo Disney Resort and Disneyland Paris, usually appearing with Stitch. On February 14 (Valentine's Day), 2021, she began appearing at Disney's Aulani resort in Hawaii. Various merchandise featuring her likeness have been sold globally, including in the United States where the anime that she appears more frequently in aired only briefly on Disney XD; this has included merchandise with Walt Disney World and Disneyland branding, and a dedicated character page on the official Disney Store website, shopDisney. She has also appeared in various video and mobile games, including Line Corporation's Disney Tsum Tsum, Bandai Namco's Disney Tsum Tsum Festival, Gameloft's Disney Magic Kingdoms and Disney Getaway Blast, and PerBlue's Disney Heroes: Battle Mode, while a plush toy of the character appears in the third episode of Monsters at Work.

Victoria

Victoria is a friend that Lilo meets in the second season of Lilo & Stitch: The Series. In her first episode, "Swapper", she had just moved into Kokaua Town, also joining Lilo's hula class. When she and Lilo were becoming friends, Mertle tried to befriend her so that she would not be Lilo's friend, claiming that she was weird. However, despite Mertle's best efforts, Victoria reveals that she also liked weird things and decided to become Lilo's best (human) friend, which Mertle angrily responds by saying, "We would never tolerate with anyone who actually has fun with Lilo." Following the agreement from the other girls, Mertle then ditches Victoria who happily remains with Lilo.

Victoria's appearance in the series is very short. She then appears briefly in the episode "Slick" where she, Lilo and the other girls compete against each other to sell the most candy bars for their hālau hula.

Then in "Snooty" (the only episode where she and Lilo are actually seen hanging out together), she becomes frightened of Experiment 277 (Snooty), a large purple bat-like experiment designed to find and enrich Snootonium, which she believed was a vampire. After Lilo discovers it's an experiment she tries to convince Victoria not to slay it, but to catch it and try to make friends with it, pointing out that the experiments can be turned from bad to good. But after it puts Stitch out of commission she refuses to believe Lilo and decides to team up with Gantu (who, unknown to her is intending to use her a bait) to slay the experiment. Later however, after Lilo shows up and saves her from Gantu she realizes her mistake and saves Snooty from Gantu. Furthermore, when Snooty shows a notable ability to clear out Victoria's often-clogged sinuses, she decides to keep him as a pet.

In "Remmy", she appears with Mertle and the other hula girls in Lilo's dream where they all treat her nicely at first, but then she begins to treat her as badly as the other girls when the dream turns into a nightmare (even turning into a giant zombie with the other girls).

She then makes a very short appearance at the end of "Wishy-Washy" where she, Lilo and the other girls all graduate to intermediate hula. She also appears twice in Leroy & Stitch, first when we see her getting a hair cut by Clip, then when she's walking with Snooty just before Leroy captures him with the other experiments.

Other recurring characters
 Mr. Wong (voiced by Clyde Kusatsu): The owner of the rental hut on Lahui Beach and Nani's employer in early season one. He is quite demanding of her working at his hut when and how he wants her to, such as having her work on her day off when an earthquake messed up the hut, but he is otherwise understanding and forgiving when she has to deal with her personal troubles. He appears in "Richter" and "Holio", and is mentioned in "Cannonball"; after Nani switches employment to Mr. Jameson, Wong does not appear again (outside of the intro) until "Woops", in which he is seen as part of Pleakley's domino show team.
 Mrs. Edmonds (voiced by April Winchell): Mertle's mother. Unlike her daughter, she is kind to Lilo. However, she also spoils her daughter heavily, to the point where Mertle even gets to celebrate "half-birthday" parties. She had her hair cut by Experiment 177 in "Clip".
 Keoni Jameson (voiced by Shaun Fleming): A young, laid-back boy on whom Lilo has a crush. Lilo constantly tries to vie for his affections. He had a crush on Pleakley, whom he knows as Lilo's 'aunt', in the episode "Hunkahunka", but in "Nosy" he stated that he only had the crush for that one week. His father owns several businesses on Kauai. He has a friend who just happens to be a girl (not a girlfriend, though). This friend is first shown in "Kixx" and later seen in "Splodyhead", "Sinker", "Melty", "Amnesio", "Nosy", "Hunkahunka", and "Morpholomew".
 Mr. Jameson (voiced by Bryan Cranston): The father of Keoni and, on several occasions, Nani's employer. He owns several businesses around Kauai, including the Birds of Paradise Hotel.
 Officer Kahiko (voiced by Kevin Michael Richardson): A police officer who knows Lilo well and occasionally tries to keep her out of trouble when she isn't accompanied by Nani. He appears in the episodes "Holio", "Bonnie & Clyde", "Snooty", and "Shush".
 Aunt Stacy (voiced by April Winchell): Mertle's aunt. She's a Hollywood producer and she strangely cannot remember Mertle's name. Her role in the TV series is extremely short, she first appears in the episode "Houdini" where she hires Stitch and Pleakley to do a magic show for Mertle's "half-birthday" party and then later hires them to do their trick on national television. Then in "Spike", she and Mertle's mom compete with Mertle in the "Ohana Rama" family trivia contest.

Characters introduced in Leroy & Stitch

Leroy (X-629)

Leroy (Experiment 629) is Stitch's evil twin brother who is created in Leroy & Stitch. He has red fur, frilly ears, yellow teeth, bent antennae, three bent spines on his back, a fluffy tail, and a slightly deeper voice as well as two extra, retractable arms and retractable claws on his front paws. Jumba started creating him from a template similar to Stitch until Dr. Hämsterviel captured him and forced him to make a "new version" of 626 (Stitch). He is designed to have all of Stitch's powers, but he also has the ability to disguise himself as Stitch by changing his fur color from red to blue and instantly regrow his fur. Leroy is very physical, but also makes liberal use of his plasma gun. After naming him "Leroy", Dr. Hämsterviel used a cloning machine to create an army, then sent the original Leroy down to Earth to capture the 624 experiments remaining there. Fortunately, Jumba secretly programmed a failsafe into Leroy before he was charged: If Leroy (or his clones) hears the song "Aloha ʻOe", his nervous system will shut down. During the battle, when the Leroys overpower the other experiments, Stitch, Lilo and Reuben sing "Aloha ʻOe", which causes Leroy and all his clones to glitch and shut down. After his defeat, Leroy and all his clones are sent to jail with Dr. Hämsterviel at the end of the movie, where they are seen happily dancing the "Jailhouse Rock". Leroy's number is never mentioned in the movie. Jumba tries to call him "627", but Gantu reminds him that he's already made Experiment 627. He is voiced by Chris Sanders.

As of June 2020, Leroy's only other appearance in the Lilo & Stitch franchise proper has been in the second chapter of a two-chapter Disney Tsum Tsum-themed side story of the manga Stitch & the Samurai that was released via the Japanese version of the Disney Tsum Tsum mobile game for a limited time throughout that month. Notably, the manga was the first Disney media to number Leroy as Experiment 629, although the second chapter of the side story was not published in English; the number would be proclaimed for English-speaking audiences the following year through a Disney-licensed sticker book revolving around the franchise.

Characters introduced in Stitch!

Yuna Kamihara

 is a tomboyish 4th grade (later 5th grade in the third season) student who lives on a fictional island off the shore of Okinawa in the Ryukyus called Izayoi Island. Living on Izayoi Island, she practices and teaches karate, having learned it from her grandfather. Her grandpa also did the honor of giving her a special type of moonsand as a good luck charm in her study of karate before he left. Yuna lives a rather normal cherished life with her grandma. The other majority of her family are elsewhere; her father is out at work a lot as a marine biologist around Okinawa, and her mother died when she was an infant. Her life remained normal yet happy until one day, after a varied coincidence, she meets Stitch, who crash-landed on her island after he got caught in a wormhole that sent him to Earth. From then and there when they met, the two became best friends and the duo go on various adventures on Stitch's quest in order to be "good". Yuna though, throughout the majority of the anime, finds friends like Taro, Sae, JJ, Tonbo, yokai like Kijimunaa, and even in experiments like Angel. Her strong sense of justice is what makes her a tomboy, which shows against evildoers like Dr. Hämsterviel and against rivals like Penny and her gang of bullies. The creators of the anime got Yuna's name from the Japanese name of sea hibiscus out in Okinawa (known in Japanese as Yuna). Yuna's birthday is on February 25. Yuna's surname Kamihara wasn't unveiled until much later, although previous guesses were Chitama, after the dojo and the forest on Izayoi and Hanako, which was Yuna's previous name and design during the development of the anime.

Gramma

Gramma (Obaa) is Yuna's grandmother who believes in the existence of yōkai. She raises Yuna during the show's first two seasons.

Kijimunaa

Kijimunaa is a little yōkai, who is Yuna and Stitch's friend. He is kind of a coward, but with the help of his friends, he can find the courage to best whatever he can. He is voiced by Colleen O'Shaughnessey in the dubbed version.

Yuna's father

A marine biologist who is very dedicated to his work, he is mostly absent from his daughter Yuna's life. Despite his dedication to his job, he loves being with his daughter. He makes sporadic appearances in photographs during the first season, but finally makes his first physical appearance in the second season. He is voiced by Keith Silverstein in the dubbed version.

BooGoo

BooGoo is a mysterious purple alien insect with some shapeshifting abilities who is introduced in the debut episode of the second season, becoming a pet to the alien side of Yuna and Stitch's family. She is considered cute and is beloved by everyone except for Stitch, who finds her to be a nuisance, especially since she tends to eat food off of him, often by tricking him to look away while he's eating or about to eat.

In her debut, she was found by Dr. Hämsterviel, who sends her to Izayoi Island to mess with Stitch's good deed counter, causing it to count good deeds as "bad" (and thus removing "good deed" points) and bad deeds as "good" (and thus adding points). She was found by Pleakley, who mistakes her to be a kind of fruit fly, and was discovered by Jumba to have been enslaved by Hämsterviel using a controlling device, which Jumba then removes, freeing her. Afterward, Jumba repairs Stitch's good deed counter, and BooGoo joins Yuna and Stitch's family.

Tigerlily Sakai

Tigerlily Sakai, named  in the Japanese original, is Yuna's beautiful but mean and bullying cousin who appears midway through season 2. While she seems to be kind-hearted to others, she is harsh and cruel to Yuna for unknown reasons, and constantly blackmails her into doing all the chores around the house (although she later claims that she's only trying to be a role model for Yuna). However, when Yuna and Stitch move off to live with her in season 3, she becomes more friendly with Yuna and treats her nicer, although she still forces her to do most of the house chores.

Cyber (X-000)

Cyber (Experiment 000) is an evil experiment that is a cyborg version of Stitch.

Delia

Delia is an evil alien woman who appears in season 3. She is in a partnership with Dr. Hämsterviel to get the Neo-PowerChip that is inside of Stitch. Delia altered a majority of experiments, which had caused them to become physically stronger and evil, as well as Angel who is rescued by Stitch. Delia usually calls Dr. Hämsterviel by wrong names or pronunciations. When Dr. Hämsterviel's plans go wrong she eventually punishes him with various explosions or robots. She is voiced by Mary Elizabeth McGlynn in the dubbed version.

Dark End

Dark End is an experiment made by Delia who is designed to be much stronger than Stitch. This experiment is female in the original Japanese version and male in the English dub. They are not among Stitch's cousins, as neither Jumba nor Hämsterviel made them.

Other characters

Seasons one and two (Madhouse)
 Taro (Tarou): Yuna's karate student and classmate. He is voiced by Stephanie Sheh in the dubbed version.
 Officer Suzuki: A policeman and one of Yuna's karate students. He is voiced by Kirk Thornton in the dubbed version.
 Mr. Honda (Honda-san): A mailman who is always exhausted from work. He is voiced by Dave Wittenberg in the dubbed version.
 Ms. Kawasaki (Kawasaki-sensei): The schoolteacher of Yuna, Penny, and Taro on Izayoi during the first two seasons, until Tigerlily takes over their class. She is voiced by Kari Wahlgren in the dubbed version.
 J.J. (Jun): A young boy who is one of Yuna's karate students. His parents, who run a dry cleaning business, are Midori (voiced by Kate Higgins in the dub) and Jack (voiced by Travis Willingham in the dub), the latter who is strict and hard-working. J.J.'s English name is short for Jack Junior. He is voiced by Laura Bailey in the dubbed version.
 Tombo: A young man who is one of Yuna's karate students. He is shown in "Angel's Flight" to be a glassblower, but by "Hull & Husk" he has a part-time job working at Penny's father's pineapple factory as a pineapple processor, saying that his glassblowing studio isn't lucrative enough. He is voiced by Dave Wittenberg in the dubbed version.
 Penny (Piko): Penny is Yuna's rival in seasons 1 and 2. She is also a black-team karate leader. She is similar to Mertle Edmonds from the previous films and series. She is voiced by Meghan Strange in the dubbed version.
 Kenny (Kouji): Kenny is Penny's older brother who is always bossed around by her. He is voiced by Derek Stephen Prince in the dubbed version.
 Marvin (Masa): Kenny and Penny's friend who has short black hair. He is always bossed around by Penny. He is voiced by Laura Bailey in the dubbed version.
 Ted (Taka): Kenny and Penny's friend who wears a cap and has orange hair. He is always bossed around by Penny. He is voiced by Kari Wahlgren in the dubbed version.
 Sasha (Sae): A young girl about Yuna's age, 9-years-old, who is introduced in the second season. Her full given name in the English dub is Sandra. A transfer student from Kobe, she joins Yuna's class amidst the second season. She believes in good fashion and beauty, and is girly in spirit, often talking about fashion, love, and all. She's also quite ditsy at times. She believes Yuna has a good fashion sense and becomes good friends with her; as her fashion sense reminded her of her mother, a tropical fashion designer. Her father is a doctor. She not only has a rather brave personality, like Yuna; but she has a sweet and gentle personality too. Kenny has a crush on Sasha, unbeknownst to her, and Penny secretly dislikes Sasha but believes that Sasha dresses better than she does. Voiced by Melissa Fahn in the dubbed version.

Season three (Shin-Ei)
 Dolores (Toyoda-san): An intelligent girl introduced in the third season who is Yuna's classmate in Okinawa New Town. She comes across as aloof towards others. She is voiced by Colleen O'Shaughnessey in the dubbed version, replacing Kijimunaa as her regular voice role for this season.
 Hiroman (Takumi): A boy from Okinawa New Town, introduced in the third season. A popular soccer player, and love interest of Jessica, he often acts cool and calm. He bears a secret of acting as a maid to his sisters and even dressing up in bishoujo-styled outfits for his sisters' enjoyment. His name obviously a play on "hero man". It is hinted that he and Yuna have feelings for each other since Yuna often saves him from trouble; in the episode "Dorkifier", it was shown that Yuna blushed at him. He is voiced by Sam Riegel in the dubbed version.
 Mr. Matsuda: Yuna's schoolteacher at New Town Elementary during the third season and Hiroman's soccer coach. He is voiced by Travis Willingham in the dub.
 Ani: Lilo's daughter who looks identically to her mother when she was a child (to the point that Stitch initially mistook Ani for a de-aged Lilo). She is voiced by Melissa Fahn in the dubbed version.
 Jessica (Reika): Jessica is Yuna's rival in season 3. She has a crush on Hiroman and friends who she bosses around. She, like Penny, likes to mock and deride Yuna and Stitch. She also bears a trait of saying rather dull jokes and puns, often met with a silent response until she forces others to laugh hysterically at them. She is voiced by Kate Higgins in the dubbed version.
 Toriko and Makiko: Jessica's friends, who are forced to laugh at her bad jokes and puns. Toriko is taller, wears a teal vest, a green shirt, a teal skirt, a purple ribbon, and purple sneakers, and has one pigtail on her right side. Makiko is shorter, has short hair, and wears an orange dress, an orange hairband, blue shorts, orange shoes, and yellow knee-high socks. They are respectively voiced in the dubbed version by Ali Hillis and Laura Bailey.

Characters introduced in Stitch & Ai

Wang Ai Ling

Wang Ai Ling is a young Chinese girl who lives in the Huangshan mountains. Her aunt Daiyu wants to move her to the city, but she wants to stay in the mountains. In her series, Ai befriends Stitch, taking him in as her "dog", and quickly develops a close emotional attachment to him. She helps him ward off the space criminals that want him. She serves as Stitch & Ais counterpart to Lilo Pelekai.

Wang Jiejie

Wang Jiejie is a young Chinese woman who is Ai's older sister. She tries to take care of her younger sister after their parents' death, but their aunt doesn't believe that Jiejie would be able to raise Ai well. Jiejie works at a tea shop for a man named Mr. Ding. She serves as this series's counterpart to Nani Pelekai.

Daiyu

Daiyu is Ai and Jiejie's aunt. After the deaths of her nieces' parents, Daiyu tries to get Ai to move from the mountains to the city, believing that Ai would be raised better over there. Although her belief that her actions are what's best for Ai are similar to how Cobra Bubbles (who also appears in this series) was considering what's best for Lilo in the original Lilo & Stitch film, Daiyu is otherwise unique to this series, having no counterpart from the original Western continuity.

Meiying

Meiying is Ai's rival. Although she serves as this series's counterpart to Mertle Edmonds, she is considerably friendlier towards Ai than Mertle was towards Lilo.

Other characters
 Commander Wombat: The leader of the reptilian alien race the Jaboodies who desires to have Stitch in his control so that the Jaboodies could win their space war against the Woolagongs and subsequently take over the galaxy. He is voiced in English by Richard Epcar.
 Commander Platypus: The leader of the platypus-like alien race the Woolagongs who also wants Stitch so that the Woolagongs could win the space war against the Jaboodies and subsequently take over the galaxy. He is voiced in English by Lucien Dodge.
 Qian Dahu: Jiejie's boyfriend and Ai's drum instructor. He serves as this series's counterpart to David Kawena, with an element of Moses Puloki with regards to his teachings of a local tradition. He is voiced in English by Lucien Dodge.
 Mr. Ding:  Jiejie's employer who runs a tea shop. He is voiced in English by Richard Epcar.
 Sage: A wise, old, and mysterious sage who observes Stitch and Ai's journey, appearing to them, Jumba, and Pleakley at times. He hands ancient scrolls to them so that Jumba can use them to make ancient Chinese creatures. He is voiced in English by Lucien Dodge.
 Dim Long: A small orange dragon-like experiment Jumba makes to beta test for future experiments the ability to fly without wings using the power of qi. Introduced in "The Lock", he acts as a pet to the aliens. In the episode "Dragon Parade", he is temporarily enlarged by Jumba to replace a dragon puppet that was accidentally burned by Meiying and her posse.
 Bao: A boy who is Ai's cousin, appearing in "The Phoenix" and "Nuo Opera". In the former episode, Daiyu brings him to Ai's home to get him to convince her how great the city is and thus motivate her to move to the city, he instead goes on an adventure with her and Stitch that causes him to love the mountains, much to Daiyu's dismay.
 Nubing and Z: Two alien bounty hunters who appear in "The Phoenix". Nubing, who is small and has four arms, is the brains of the duo, while Z is the large, muscular, unintelligible brawn who carries Nubing in a compartment on his chest piece. They appear on Earth searching for and trying to capture the titular phoenix Jumba made in the episode to sell to collectors, but they eventually get stopped by Stitch, Ai, and Bao. In exchange for freeing them and the phoenix, Ai and Bao then convince the hunters to switch to photography to take and sell photos of rare creatures, with Ai giving them her camera.
 Skippity: A clumsy alien spy who appears in "Dream On", working for the Woolagongs. He likes to brag about himself in rhyme. He was sent to Earth by them to use a special raygun he invented called a "Dream Beam", which makes its victims' dreams come to life. He tries to incapacitate Stitch by making Stitch's bad dreams come to life, but he ends up shooting Ai by mistake. Stitch later captures him and he, Jumba, Pleakley, and Jumba's newly-made mo have Skippity help them find Ai after she skips school. At the end of the episode, Jumba allows Skippity to live in the parallel dimension where he sends his recreated Chinese mythological creatures to live in, as Skippity likes animals.
 Scratch: An alien "morph creature" who has the ability to change his appearance and materialize and transform objects, appearing in the final two episodes. He takes on the appearance of a Stitch-like genetic experiment with teal striped fur and heavily notched ears after Stitch wishes for a brother using a tetrahedron-shaped device sent by the Jaboodies called a "Tetra-Tab". He was actually sent by the Jaboodies to trigger Stitch's destructive programming and metamorphosis program.

References

Lists of Disney animated film characters
Lists of fictional extraterrestrial characters
Lists of characters in American television animation
Lilo & Stitch
Lilo & Stitch